The Politics of British Columbia involves not only the governance of British Columbia, Canada, and the various political factions that have held or vied for legislative power, but also a number of experiments or attempts at political and electoral reform.

History of politics in British Columbia

From BC's start as a province,  BC used a mixture of the first past the post elections in single-member districts and multi-member districts where voters cast multiple votes (Block Voting). This was in use except for a small break in the 1950s, until the 1980s.

Prior to 1903, there were no political parties in British Columbia, other than at the federal level. One exception to this was the Nationalist Party, BC's first labour party founded in 1894. It elected an MLA in the 1894 and 1898 provincial election - Robert Macpherson.

Sir Richard McBride was the first Premier of British Columbia to declare a party affiliation (Conservative Party) and institute conventional party/caucus politics.

Since party politics were introduced to British Columbia, there have been a number of political parties which have controlled the government for more than ten years, including the Conservative government of the early 20th century, the interwar Liberal government, the post-war Social Credit ("Socred") government of W.A.C. Bennett and, following a further brief reign by the New Democratic (NDP), another Social Credit government under his son, Bill Bennett, the NDP government of the 1990s and the BC Liberal Party Government in the 2000s under Gordon Campbell.

During the 1940s, the government was controlled by a coalition of the Liberals and Conservatives. Neither party had the electoral strength to form a majority, so a coalition was used as a means to prevent the B.C. Co-operative Commonwealth Federation (CCF) (the forerunner of the NDP) from taking power.

From 1972 to 1975, an NDP government led by Dave Barrett held power but was defeated after a showdown with organized labour. Social Credit was returned to power with a new leader, and the son of the former Premier, Bill Bennett, who had been recruited by the party's old guard but brought in a new style of politics.  In 1986, the younger Bennett retired from politics and his successor was Bill Vander Zalm. Under his leadership, he and his party became increasingly unpopular. In the face of mounting unpopularity and numerous scandals, the party was defeated by the NDP who went on to lead the province for the next ten years. Mike Harcourt led the NDP for the first half of this NDP decade, but the party had difficulty finding stable leadership after that, going through three leaders and premiers over the next five years. The rejuvenated BC Liberal Party won the next four elections before losing the 2017 election to the NDP government under John Horgan. 

In western Canada (other than Alberta until 2015), typically politics have featured the CCF or NDP on the left and some other party on the right.  The present incarnation of the BC Liberal Party fulfills this role: the BC Liberal Party is neutral federally and derives its membership from the centre to the centre right.  Since its takeover by supporters of Premier Gordon Campbell following the ouster of Gordon Wilson (who led the party from effective oblivion to Official Opposition in the 1991 general election), many consider it to be effectively a rebirth of the defunct BC Social Credit Party.

After the introduction of partisan politics (1903–1952)

The Social Credit era (1952–1991)

After Social Credit (1991 to present)

Electoral reform

Recall and initiative

British Columbia is the only province in Canada with recall-election and initiative legislation. These measures applied following the 1991 referendum.

Only one recall petition was ever successful: that compelling MLA Paul Reitsma to resign his seat in 1998 – hours before he would have been removed from office.

Fixed election dates

British Columbia was the first province in Canada to institute fixed election dates. Previously, British Columbia elections were like most parliamentary jurisdictions, which only require an election within a specified period of time (being five years in all jurisdictions of Canada).

Alternative voting systems

1950s to the 1980s

By the 1950s, the Liberal-Conservative coalition had begun to fall apart. One of the last acts of the coalition government was to adopt the alternative voting system, which was implemented for the 1952 general election.

Under this system single-member districts and preferential voting was used. Rather than voting for one candidate by marking an X on  their ballots, electors ranked their choices of candidates by placing numbers next to the names of the candidates on the ballot. If a candidate received an absolute simple majority of votes, that candidate would be elected. If not, the candidate with the fewest votes was dropped and the second choices marked on the candidate's ballots were allocated among the remaining candidates. This procedure was  repeated until a candidate received a majority of votes.

The result was the election of enough candidates of the new Social Credit party to form a Socred minority government, with the CCF forming the official opposition. The Liberals were reduced to four members in the Legislature. The Conservatives (who had changed their name to “Progressive Conservative” in tandem with their federal counterparts) were reduced to three.

The Socred minority government lasted only nine months. The Alternate Voting system was again employed for the ensuing general election. The result was a Socred majority. During this term of office, the Socreds abolished the alternative voting system and returned the province to the traditional voting system, a system that used both single-member districts and multi-member districts elected with a block voting system, both using first past the post system.

This mixed multiple-member and single-member district system with Block voting, was abolished in the 1980s, bringing single-member FPTP into use consistently.

2000s

In 2004, a Citizens' Assembly recommended replacing the First Past the Post system with a Single Transferable Vote system to be implemented in 2009, and a referendum was held on May 17, 2005 to determine if this change should go ahead. The proposal received majority support (57% of the popular vote), but the government had required 60% to make the proposal binding. A second requirement was a simple majority in 60% of the current ridings and 77 of the 79 ridings achieved this, far more than the 48 minimum. The close result has provoked further interest in electoral reform.  As a result of this, the Provincial Government promised a second referendum on the issue. The second referendum was held in conjunction with the 2009 general election but it also failed, garnering just over 39% of voter support.

2010s 

In 2017 election, the BC NDP campaigned on the promise to hold a referendum on switching to a electoral system of proportional representation. A referendum was held in the subsequent year with two questions on the ballot. The first question was a binary choice between the current first past the post electoral system and a proportional representation electoral system. The second question asked citizens to rank three specific types of proportional representation: dual-member proportional representation, mixed-member proportional representation, and rural–urban proportional representation. (Ironically, this second question used a ranked ballot to determine the preferred method of proportional representation.) If a majority of citizens preferred proportional representation over first past the post, this second question would determine which specific type of proportional representation the province would adopt. In the end, the second question was moot as voters decicively chose the familiar first past the post system (61.3%) over the unfamiliar proportional representation (38.7%). After the results of the referendum were released (and even during the referendum campaign), critics suggested that a major reason that proportional representation was defeated was the complexity of the second ballot question. Although the general public was knowledgeable enough to understand the difference between first past the post and proportional representation, the subtle and numerous differences between dual-member proportional representation, mixed-member proportional representation, and rural–urban proportional representation were less easy to understand, motivating voters to stick with the electoral system.

See also

 Outline of government and politics of British Columbia
 Executive Council of British Columbia
 Legislative Assembly of British Columbia
 List of political parties in British Columbia
 List of British Columbia general elections
 List of premiers of British Columbia
 Council of the Federation
 Politics of Canada
 Political culture of Canada

References

External links
 CBC Digital Archives – How the West is Won: A Half-century of B.C. Elections